The Baiyang River, also known under a Mongolian name transcribed in Chinese as Namuguolei, is a river in Xinjiang Uighur Autonomous Region of China. It flows through the region's Tacheng Prefecture and the Urho District of Karamay City. The river's basin occupies ,

The Baiyang River starts in a massif near the junction of the Tarbagatai and Saur mountain ranges, near Xinjiang's border with Kazakhstan. It flows in a general southeastern direction, toward the endorheic Dzungarian Basin. Along much of its length it forms the border between Hoboksar Mongol Autonomous County in the east and Emin and Toli Counties in the west. It crosses Urho District of Karamay City, and then re-enters Hoboksar County.

A provision has been made for letting about 1/3 of the water flow from the canal into the Baiyang River,, thus improving the water supply situation in Urho District and  a revitalizing the riverside wetlands. The Baiyang River canyon in the western part of Urho  District is considered a scenic site.

The river enters the Gurbantünggüt Desert and ends in the endorheic Ailik Lake. The river forms a small delta as it enters the lake.

Potentially, water can seep through the same fault even farther to the southwest, to the dry Alan Nur lake (the former terminus of the Manas River).

A distributary canal

Other uses
Numerous watercourses in Central Asia (including Kazakhstan and Xinjiang) carry names meaning "Poplar River" in Chinese or in a Turkic language. This includes the Baiyang River of Toksun County, which flows from the main Tian Shan range toward Lake Aydingkol, as well as several Terekty Rivers in Kazakhstan or Kazakh-speaking sections of Xinjiang.

Notes

Rivers of Xinjiang